WNWR (1540 AM) is a commercial radio station in Philadelphia, Pennsylvania owned by Aztec Capital Partners. Its studio is located at 200 Monument Road, Suite 6, Bala Cynwyd, Pennsylvania and its transmitter is located in the Roxborough neighborhood of Philadelphia, off Ridge Avenue.

The station airs a simulcast of WHAT 1340 AM airing Spanish music.

History
The station first signed on the air on July 11, 1947.  Its call sign was WJMJ which stood for "Jesus, Mary, Joseph."  The station broadcast middle-of-the-road music and religious programming.  It was owned by Patrick Joseph Stanton and had its offices and studios in the St. James Hotel.  It was a daytimer, powered at 1,000 watts and forced to sign-off at sunset to avoid interfering with other stations on 1540 kHz.  In the late 1950s, the station got a boost to 50,000 watts, but it still had to stay off the air at night. One of the programs carried on WJMJ in the 1950s was George A. Palmer's popular Morning Cheer daily broadcast.

In 1965 it was acquired by Rust Craft Greeting Cards, which changed the call letters to WRCP, which stood for Rust Craft Philadelphia.  In 1967, Rust Craft changed the format to country music, a format not found on the Philadelphia radio dial.  In 1981, after 560 WFIL adopted a country format, WRCP switched to oldies. Later in 1985, the call sign was changed to WSNI to match sister station 104.5 WSNI-FM (now WRFF).  For a time, the AM broadcast an all-Beatles-and-Motown format. After two years, a more conventional oldies mix returned and the station became WPGR ("Philly Gold Radio").

In 1995, the station was sold to new owners operating as Global Radio LLC, becoming WNWR.  The call letters stand for New World Radio.  It switched to mostly ethnic brokered programming, where show hosts bought time on the station and sold advertising in their communities to pay for their broadcasts. On June 13, 2011, WNWR's entire brokered program schedule moved to AM 860 WWDB. The station was then leased to broadcast China Radio International. Several years later, WNWR got authorization from the Federal Communications Commission to stay on the air around the clock with low power at night. WNWR has gone off the air and is listed as silent since June 14, 2018. 
As of Saturday November 17, 2018 WNWR returned on the air broadcasting a Spanish language format. 
On December 8, 2019, however, it was on the FCC's Silent AM Stations List. 
As of April 27, 2021, WNWR returned to the airwaves with 1,000 watts of power during the day and 7 watts at night according to their engineer, Dana Puopolo.

References

External links
FCC History Cards for WNWR

NWR
Radio stations established in 1947
1947 establishments in Pennsylvania
NWR